The Gnawa (or Gnaoua, Ghanawa, Ghanawi, Gnawi'; Arabic: ڭناوة) are an ethnic group inhabiting Morocco.

The name Gnawa probably originated in the indigenous language of North Africa and the Sahara Desert. The phonology of this term according to the grammatical principles of Berber is agnaw (singular) and ignawen (plural), which means mute or dyslalic. Another explanation of the word Gnawa or Gnaoua (plural of Gnawi)  is that the term Gnawa comes from the slaves who were brought to Morocco from Guinea many centuries ago.

Gnawa was inscribed in 2019 on the Representative List of the Intangible Cultural Heritage of Humanity.

History
The Gnawa population is generally believed to originate from the Sahelian region of Africa especially from Kano a Hausa Land in present Day Nigeria, which had long and extensive trading and political ties with Morocco. The Gnawa are an ethnic group who were brought to Morocco as slaves, and their ancestry is traced to sub-Saharan West Africa. After the abolition of slavery, they became a part of the Sufi order in the Maghreb. While adopting Islam, the Gnawa continued to celebrate ritual possession during rituals which were devoted to the practice of dances of possession and fright. This rite of possession is called Jedba.

Gnawa and music

Gnawa music mixes classical Islamic Sufism with pre-Islamic African folk traditions. The term Gnawa musicians generally refers to people who also practice healing rituals. The healing rituals have apparent ties to pre-Islamic African animism rites known as Bori in the Hausa culture. In Moroccan popular culture, Gnawas, through their ceremonies, are considered to be experts in the magical treatment of scorpion stings and mental illness. They heal diseases by the use of colors, condensed cultural imagery, perfumes and fright.

Gnawas play deeply hypnotic trance music marked by low-toned, rhythmic melodies played on a skin-covered lute called a sintir or guembri. The method, similar to garaya in Hausa traditional music, involves call-and-response singing, hand-clapping, and cymbals called krakeb (plural of karkaba). Gnawa ceremonies use music and dance to evoke ancestral saints who are said to perform the healing.

Gnawa music has won an international profile and appeal.  Many Western musicians, including Bill Laswell, Brian Jones, Randy Weston, Adam Rudolph, Tucker Martine, Robert Plant, Jacob Collier and Jimmy Page, have drawn on and collaborated with Gnawa musicians such as brothers Mahmoud Guinia and Mokhtar Gania of Essaouira, brothers Mustapha Baqbou & Ahmed Baqbou, Abdelkebir Merchane, Brahim Belkani,  all from Marrakesh, as well as Hamid El Kasri and Abdelkader Amlil of Rabat and the late Ahmida Boussou and Saïd Oughassal of Casablanca, who have all participated at the annual festival in Essaouira.  Some traditionalists regard modern collaborations as a mixed blessing, leaving or modifying sacred traditions for more explicitly commercial goals. International recording artists such as Hassan Hakmoun have introduced Gnawa music and dance to Western audiences through their recordings and concert performances.

The centres for Gnawa music are Marrakesh, Tangier, Rabat, Casablanca, Fez and Essaouira, which is in the southwest of Morocco where the Gnaoua World Music Festival is held annually. The Gnawa of Marrakesh hold their annual festival at the sanctuary of Moulay Brahim in the Atlas Mountains and around the sanctuary of Moulay Abdullah bin Tsain in the village of Tamesloht, between Marrakesh and the town of Amizmiz. The festivals take place in connection with the birthday of the Prophet.

The Gnawa of Khamlia hold their annual festival in August at the village of Khamlia in Erg Chebbi.

Finally there is also a special tribe inside Gnawa called Ganga. The Ganga are of Amazigh or Chleuh origin and typically speak Tashelhait, and are found in Haha between Essaouira and Agadir and in the Sous Valley around towns like Agadir and Taroudant. They do not play the guimbri but only focus on the dance known as kouyou, playing krakeb and the large drums called tebel or ganga, which is also part of the procession of the regular gnawa ceremony.

See also
Bechar
Essaouira
Haha (tribe)
Haratin
Jilala
Moga Festival

References

General references
Ibiblio.org: Gnawa Stories: Mystical Musician Healers from Morocco
gnawa at the Moroccan ministry of Communication website
WorldMusicCentral.org
PTWMusic.com: gnawa by Chouki El Hamel at Duke University December 1, 2000
Etymology of "Gnawa" from Encyclopædia Britannica
Ben Saidi, A (2003) Amazigh Kateb Yassin discusses Maghreb Blues and Ghanawa Music-a diffusion of Berber, Arabic genres

Further reading
Bernasek, L & Burger, H. S. (2008) Imazighen!: Beauty and Artisanship in Berber Life, Peabody Museum Press
Courtney-Clarke, M & Brooks, G. (1996) Imazighen: The Vanishing Traditions of Berber Women, Thames & Hudson Ltd, London, UK
El-Ghissassi, H. (2006) Regard sur Le Laroc de Mohamed VI, Michel Lafon
Ennaji, M (2005) Multilingualism, Cultural Identity and Education in Morocco, Springer, New York, USA
Harris, W. (2003) Morocco that Was, Eland Books, London, UK
Hart, D.M. (2000) Tribe and Society in Rural Morocco, Frank Cass Publishers
Howe, M (2005) Morocco: The Islamist Awakening and Other Challenges, University of Oxford Press, New York, USA
Hoffman, K.E. (2008) We Share Walls: Language, Land, and Gender in Berber Morocco, Wiley-Blackwell
Maxwell, G (2000) Lords of the Atlas, Weidenfeld & Nicolson Illustrated
Maxwell, G (2002) Lords of the Atlas: The Rise and Fall of the House of Glaoua 1893–1956, The Lyons Press
McKissack, F. & McKissack, P. (1995) The Royal Kingdoms of Ghana, Mali, and Songhay: Life in Medieval Africa, Henry Holt and Co. LLC
Pennell, C.R. (2003) Morocco: From Empire to Independence, OneWorld Publications
Pennel, C.R. (2001) Morocco since 1830: A History, NYU Press, USA
Porch, D (1983) The Conquest of Morocco - The Bizarre History of France's Last Great Colonial Adventure, the Long Struggle to Subdue a Medieval Kingdom By Intrigue and Force of Arms 1903–1914, Knopf
Porch, D, 2nd Ed (2005) The Conquest of the Sahara, Ferrar, Straus & Giroux
Rogerson, B & Lavington, S Edited by (2004) Marrakech, The Red City: The City through Writers' Eyes, Sickle Moon Books

External links
Gnawa.net 
 http://www.vodeo.tv/4-33-3982-des-gnawa-dans-le-bocage.html
 https://web.archive.org/web/20070929102727/http://www.editions-harmattan.fr/index.asp?navig=catalogue&obj=video&no=1052
 https://web.archive.org/web/20070928063425/http://prep-cncfr.seevia.com/idc/data/Cnc/Recherche/fiche2.asp?idf=3313
Essaouira at WorldMusicCentral.org
gnawa at brickhaus.com
Gnawa Music
- Festival d'Essaouira Gnaoua et Musiques du Monde

Ethnic groups in Algeria
Ethnic groups in Morocco
Muslim communities in Africa
Sufism in Africa